Meroles is a genus of lizards, commonly known as desert lizards, in the family Lacertidae. The genus contains eight species, inhabiting southwestern Africa, especially the Namib Desert.

Description
Desert lizards have fine, granular dorsal scales. The hind toes are elongated and possess fringes of scales.

Species
The following eight species are recognized as being valid.
Meroles anchietae  - shovel-snouted lizard, Anchieta's dune lizard
Meroles ctenodactylus  - giant desert lizard, Smith's sand lizard, Smith's desert lizard
Meroles cuneirostris  -wedge-snouted sand lizard, wedge-snouted desert lizard
Meroles knoxii  - Knox's ocellated sand lizard, Knox's desert lizard
Meroles micropholidotus  - small-scaled desert lizard
Meroles reticulatus  - reticulate sand lizard
Meroles squamulosus  - common rough-scaled lizard, savanna lizard
Meroles suborbitalis  - spotted sand lizard

Nota bene: A binomial authority in parentheses indicates that the species was originally described in a genus other than Meroles.

References

Further reading
Gray JE (1838). "Catalogue of the Slender-tongued Saurians, with Descriptions of many new Genera and Species". Ann. Mag. Nat. Hist., [First Series] 1: 274–283, 388–394. (Meroles, new genus, p. 282).

External links
Meroles in the Reptile Database.

 
Lizard genera
Lacertid lizards of Africa
Taxa named by John Edward Gray